Liyang Guanghua Senior High School is a school located in the southern city of Liyang, China.

History 
In August 1939, the school was established by Chen Yi, Su Yu, and others. The school became a "Four Star" high school in 2008.

Resources 
The school covers 52,619 square meters. There are 36 classes, with nearly two thousand students. There is an art room and music classroom. For sport, there is a basketball court, table tennis room, and dance room.

Management 
The school's management system is divided into 20 small organizations, such as the administrative institution, party organization, trade union organization, the moral education leadership group, the legal system education leadership team, and teams who are responsible for the graduating classes, and others in charge of testing papers.

Campus 
The stadium of Guanghua Senior High School has a basketball court, dancing room, table tennis room, and badminton court.

Awards 
 Model Civilized Unit
 Garden Unit in Jiangsu Province
 Information Technology Specialist School
 Family of Model Worker
 Level One Campus Network
 Advanced Collective in Modern Educational Technology
 Four-Star Level High School

References

External links
 Official website

High schools in Jiangsu
Education in Changzhou
Educational institutions established in 1939
1939 establishments in China